Aero-Dienst GmbH & Co. KG is a German charter airline operating business jet and air ambulance flights out of Nuremberg Airport.

History

The company was founded in 1958 by the companies "Diehl" and "Faun", initially operating several jet and propeller aircraft and helicopters. Since 1998, Aero-Dienst has operated air ambulance services on behalf of ADAC. It is one of the oldest commercial airlines in Germany that still operates under its original name.

Fleet
As of November 2018, Aero-Dienst operates the following aircraft for its charter and ambulance services:

 1 Beechcraft King Air 350 
 1 Bombardier Challenger 300
 1 Bombardier Challenger 604
 2 Dornier 328JET (as of August 2019)
 1 Learjet 45
 2 Learjet 60

Accidents and incidents
On 7 June 1993, an Aero-Dienst Learjet 35A (registered D-COCO) crashed shortly after takeoff from Cologne Bonn Airport on a chartered flight to Nuremberg, killing the two passengers and two crew members on board.

References

External links
Official website

Airlines established in 1958
Airlines of Germany
1958 establishments in West Germany